Light water or Lightwater may refer to:

Science
 Deuterium-depleted water, which has a lower concentration of deuterium than occurs naturally on Earth
 Water, especially water that is not heavy water
 Water, the coolant in a light-water reactor type of nuclear reactor

Other uses
 Lightwater, a town in Surrey, England

See also
 Semiheavy water, the result of replacing one of the protium in light water to deuterium
 Heavy water, a form of water that contains a larger than normal amount of the hydrogen isotope deuterium